Chinese civilization may refer to:
 The country China
 Chinese culture
 Greater China
 History of China
 Zhonghua minzu

See also
 East Asian cultural sphere, also known as the Sinic world or Far Eastern civilization
 Sinosphere
 Adoption of Chinese literary culture